Meek's Cutoff is a 2010 American Western film directed by Kelly Reichardt. The film was shown in competition at the 67th Venice International Film Festival. The story is loosely based on a historical incident on the Oregon Trail in 1845, in which frontier guide Stephen Meek led a wagon train on an ill-fated journey through the Oregon desert along the route later known as the Meek Cutoff in the western United States. The film is formatted in the Academy ratio (1.37:1), a standard used in many classic Westerns.

Plot
A small group of settlers travelling across the Oregon High Desert in 1845 suspect that their guide, Stephen Meek, may not know the area well enough to plot a safe and certain route. A journey that was supposed to take two weeks, via what became known as the Meek Cutoff, stretches into five. With no clear sense of where they are going, tensions rise as water and food run low. The wives look on, unable to participate in the decision making, as their husbands discuss how long they should continue to follow Meek.

The dynamics of power shift when they capture a lone native and hold him in the hope he will lead them to a source of water, despite Meek's wish to kill him at once. Meek argues that the native cannot be trusted, but the group by now have no confidence in Meek. Later, when Meek prepares to shoot the native, Mrs. Tetherow intervenes. In the end, after the group encounters the positive sign of a tree, Meek submits to majority opinion. The fate of the group is left ambiguous as the native continues to walk on.

Cast
Michelle Williams as Emily Tetherow
Bruce Greenwood as Stephen Meek
Shirley Henderson as Glory White
Tommy Nelson as Jimmy White
Neal Huff as William White
Paul Dano as Thomas Gately
Zoe Kazan as Millie Gately
Will Patton as Solomon Tetherow
Rod Rondeaux as The Indian

Critical reception
Review aggregator Rotten Tomatoes gave the film an 86% approval rating based on reviews from 130 critics, with an average score of 7.5/10. It reported the consensus, "Moving at a contemplative speed unseen in most westerns, Meek's Cutoff is an effective, intense journey of terror and survival in the untamed frontier." At Metacritic, which assigns a weighted average score out of 100 to reviews from mainstream critics, the film received an average score of 85 based on 36 reviews.

See also

 Survival film, about the film genre, with a list of related films

References

External links
 
 
 
 Meek's Cutoff  at Metacritic
 

2010 films
2010 independent films
2010 Western (genre) films
American Western (genre) films
Films directed by Kelly Reichardt
Films set in 1845
Films shot in Oregon
2010 drama films
Films set in Oregon
2010s English-language films
2010s American films